Palau–Taiwan relations are the bilateral relations between Palau and Taiwan. Palau maintains an embassy in Taipei and the ROC maintains an embassy in Koror City. Exchanges between the two nations range from agriculture, culture, education, fishery, medical services, tourism and water supply infrastructure.

History
Palau and Taiwan have had economic and political relations since 1994. In late December 1999, Palau officially established diplomatic relations with the ROC. Taiwan have funded Palauan buildings such as the Palasia Hotel, Palau Royal Resort, Hung Kuo Resort  and Papago International Resort. In 2010, a petroleum company of the People's Republic of China signed a US$40 million cooperation with Palau to explore oil reserve around the islands country. 

On 6 June 2017, Palau Health Minister Emais Roberts visited Taipei. In December 2017, Palau's ambassador to Taiwan stated that Palau-Taiwan relations is 'extremely stable', and that Palau would not shift diplomatic relations to mainland China. President Tsai Ing-wen visited Palau in 2019 and President Surangel Whipps Jr. visited Taiwan in 2021. In 2021, a travel bubble was set up between the two countries.

See also
 Foreign relations of Palau

References

Taiwan
Palau